Savoia may refer to:

Savoy, a region of France
Savoie, Department of France
House of Savoy, a royal house of Italy until 1946
Savoia-Marchetti, an Italian aircraft manufacturer
Savoia Castle, a castle near Prague, Czech Republic
Savoia di Lucania, a village in the province of Potenza, Italy
Luigi di Savoia, Libya, the Italian name of Al Abraq, Libya
, an Italian ocean liner in service from 1932 to 1945
, an Italian refrigerated cargo ship in service from 1922 to 1968
FC Savoia 1908, an Italian football club located in Torre Annunziata, Campania that currently plays in Serie D
6th Mechanized Infantry Regiment “Saboya”, a mechanized infantry unit in the Spanish Army